Ivan Fyodorovich Pereverzev (3 September 1914 – 23 April 1978) was a Soviet and Russian stage and film actor. People's Artist of the USSR (1975).

Filmography

 The Conveyor of Death (1933) – episode (uncredited)
The Private Life of Pyotr Vinogradov (1934) – fitness instructor (uncredited)
My Love (1940) – Grisha
 Ivan Nikulin: Russian Sailor (1944) – Ivan Nikulin
 It Happened in the Donbas (1945) – Stepan Andreyevich Ryabinin
 The First Glove (1946) – Nikita Krutikov
 The Third Blow (1948) – Yakov Kreizer
The Court of Honor (1948) – Ivan Ivanovich Petrenko
 Dream of a Cossack (1950) – Andrei Petrovich Boichenko
Far from Moscow (1950) – engineer (uncredited)
 Taras Shevchenko (1951) – Zygmunt Sierakowski
 Sadko (1952) – Timofey Larionovich
Admiral Ushakov (1953) – Fyodor Ushakov
 Attack from the Sea (1953) – Fyodor Ushakov
 Heroes of Shipka (1954) – Katorgin
The Variegateds Case (1958) – "Stranger" the spy
My Beloved (1958) – Kozyrev
The Sky Beckons (1959) – Yevgeny Kornev
Michman Panin (1960) – Ivan Grigoryev
 Scarlet Sails (1961) – Longren
Silence (1963) – Lukovsky
 Meet Baluyev! (1963) – Pavel Gavrilovich Baluyev
 The Enchanted Desna (1964) – construction manager
 Strong with Spirit (1967) – Dmitry Medvedev
The New Adventures of the Elusive Avengers (1968) – Smirnov, Red Cavalry Army chief of staff
Trembita (1968) – Prokop, Mikola's father
Dangerous Tour (1969) – Kazimir Kazimirovich Kulbras, general governor
Bonivur's Heart (1969) – Zhilin, old peasant
 Liberation (1970) – Vasily Chuikov
The Crown of the Russian Empire, or Once Again the Elusive Avengers (1971) – Smirnov, chief of JSPD
 Adventures in a City that Does Not Exist (1974) – Long John Silver
 A Very English Murder (1974) – Briggs, butler (voiced by Yevgeny Vesnik)
Front Without Flanks (1975) – father Pavel
Front Beyond the Front Line (1977) – father Pavel

References

External links

 

1914 births
1978 deaths
20th-century Russian male actors
People from Oryol Governorate
Communist Party of the Soviet Union members
Honored Artists of the RSFSR
People's Artists of the RSFSR
People's Artists of the USSR
Stalin Prize winners
Recipients of the Order of the Red Banner of Labour
Russian male film actors
Russian male stage actors
Russian male voice actors
Soviet male film actors
Soviet male stage actors
Soviet male voice actors
Burials at Kuntsevo Cemetery